Mark Hewins (born 24 March 1955) is an English guitarist known for his connections to the Canterbury scene, a group of English progressive rock musicians during the 1960s.

Biography 
Hewins' professional career as a guitarist began in 1973 with the London band Mother Sun with Steve Tozer and lead singer Dave Bell. Early work included on the Dance Orchestra's A Luta Continua (alongside Phil Collins, John Martyn, and Danny Thompson).

Hewins has worked extensively with various Canterbury scene musicians, including multiple projects with Elton Dean. He played on Dave Sinclair's Moon Over Man album and with him in The Polite Force (1976-8, Canterbury Knights album). He was in Going Going (1990) and Caravan of Dreams (1991) with Richard Sinclair. Hewins played in later incarnations of Soft Heap (with Dean, Pip Pyle and John Greaves) and can be heard on A Veritable Centaur. He was a member of Gong in 1999. Hewins has also worked extensively with Hugh Hopper, including in Dark Horse and Mashu (1995-8). Hewins also worked with Mashu percussionist Shyamal Maïtra on other projects, including a duo and a trio with Carol Grimes.

He has collaborated with Dennis Gonzalez and Andrew Cyrille in the U.S. and in Europe with Django Bates in Research. Hewins' first solo album was The Electric Guitar (1987). He was Lou Reed's guitar tech on several tours.

He leads his big band FF, his dance band Tritonik (with Tania Evans, who went on to Culture Beat), and the Music Doctors (with Dean and Lol Coxhill). He has played with Julie Felix, Bill Bruford, Fred Frith, Joe Lee Wilson, Dudu Pukwana, John Stevens, Mervyn Africa, and Anthony Aiello. He has also written music for film and television commercials.

Discography

Solo albums 
 1989: The Electric Guitar (Daagnim Records)
 1994: Provocative Thought - Live At The Vortex (Musart Services), with Hugh Hopper
 1995: Adreamor (Impetus Records), with Hugh Hopper
 1999: Big Big Spaces: Transmissions From Intergalactic Space (Online Mp3 album)
 2001: Bar Torque (Moonjune Records), with Elton Dean
 2002: Guerilla Music (Moonjune Records), with Theo Travis

Collaborations 
 With Research
 1987: Social Systems (Dossier)	
 2000: The Perpetual City (Impetus Records)

 With John Stevens Dance Orchestra
 1994: A Luta Continua (Konnex Records)

 With Soft Heap
 1995: A Veritable Centaur (Impetus Records)

 With Mashu
 1996: Elephants In Your Head? (Voiceprint)

 With Polite Force
 1996: Canterbury Knights'' (Voiceprint)

References

1955 births
20th-century British guitarists
21st-century British guitarists
Canterbury scene
English jazz guitarists
English male guitarists
Gong (band) members
Living people
20th-century British male musicians
21st-century British male musicians
British male jazz musicians
Curfew (band) members